Cosmographia et geographia de Affrica ("Cosmography and geography of Africa") is a work completed by Leo Africanus March 10, 1526. The text from this work was taken by Giovambattista Ramusio and published in the Descrittione dell’Africa in Venice in 1550.

The original 928 page manuscript exists in its entirety and is held at the National Central Library of Rome, MS V.E. 953. Gabriele Amadori published a first critical edition of this text in 2014.

Content 
In the text, Leo Africanus divided Africa into four parts: Barbary, Numidia, Libya, and the Black Lands, areas covering Mediterranean Africa from Morocco to Egypt and spanning to the territories immediately South of the Sahara, from the Atlantic Ocean to Ethiopia.

References 

Manuscripts